Peter Pappenheim (19 December 1926 – 2021) was a Dutch alpine skier and economist. He competed in three events at the 1952 Winter Olympics.

Pappenheim died in 2021.

References

1926 births
2021 deaths
20th-century Dutch people
Alpine skiers at the 1952 Winter Olympics
Dutch male alpine skiers
Olympic alpine skiers of the Netherlands
Sportspeople from Amsterdam